Mein Schiff 4 (My Ship 4) is a cruise ship owned by TUI Cruises. Built by Meyer Turku Shipyard in Turku, Finland, she was floated out on 10 October 2014, delivered to TUI Cruises on 8 May 2015, and christened by former Olympic swimmer Franziska van Almsick in Kiel, Germany, on 5 June 2015.

For the most part, Mein Schiff 4 is a copy of her sister ship, Mein Schiff 3.

Service history 
On 14 May 2015, Mein Schiff 4 entered her first port, Kiel, from where she was scheduled to operate a series of short inaugural cruises.  She returned to Kiel on 5 June 2015.

That afternoon and evening, TUI Cruises held a ceremony at Kiel's  cruise terminal, to celebrate the ship's entry into service. Around 1,000 guests were present inside Mein Schiff 4s theatre; an estimated 25,000 spectators watched the event from outside. Van Almsick then christened Mein Schiff 4, by smashing a bottle of Pommery champagne against the ship's side. The ceremony later concluded with a late-night fireworks display, accompanied by an electro and house set from DJ Tanja La Croix.

The following day, 6 June 2015, Mein Schiff 4 departed from Kiel on her maiden voyage, to the eastern Baltic.  She was home ported in Kiel for the 2015 summer season, and operate seven-day voyages to the Canary Islands, Morocco and Madeira during the winter.

References 

Cruise ships
2014 ships
Ships built in Turku